Flame Ventures LLC. is an American production company started by current owner and CEO Tony Krantz based in Beverly Hills, California. The company was a producer and distributor of Major League Gaming's Boost Mobile MLG Pro Circuit television program.

In 2006, Flame Ventures co-produced the Unstable Fables animated series, Netflix Shorts and animated shorts. The company also worked on the NBC series Dracula. Flame Ventures produced Wu Assassins for Netflix, a martial arts series starring Iko Uwais and it premiered on August 8, 2019.

Selected filmography

References

Film production companies of the United States
Companies based in Beverly Hills, California